D'Marco Carnelius Jackson (born July 20, 1998) is an American football linebacker for the New Orleans Saints of the National Football League (NFL). He played college football at Appalachian State.

High school career 
Jackson grew up in Spartanburg, South Carolina and attended Broome High School. As a senior, Jackson was a finalist for the South Carolina's Mr. Football award. As a senior, Jackson recorded 78 tackles, 16 tackles for loss and a sack. He was listed as a two-star recruit and the 61st best player in South Carolina by 247Sports.com. Jackson committed to Appalachian State University over offers from Charlotte and Georgia Southern.

College career 
Jackson redshirted his first year on campus and appeared in all 13 games as a redshirt freshman, recording 25 tackles and two tackles for loss. The following season, Jackson had 60 tackles and three sacks. In his junior season, he tallied 87 tackles, 2.5 sacks, two interceptions, and he was named to the second-team All-Sun Belt. Both of Jackson's interceptions came in a 45–17 victory over Arkansas State. Jackson played in all 14 games his senior season. He would have a career high 119 tackles and six sacks, as well as a forced fumble. Jackson was named to the first-team All-Sun Belt and the Sun Belt Defensive Player of the Year. Jackson would play in 53 games with the Mountaineers, were they amassed a record of 43–10.

Professional career 

Jackson was drafted by the New Orleans Saints in the fifth round (161st overall) of the 2022 NFL Draft. He was placed on injured reserve on August 9, 2022.

Personal life 
Jackson is the cousin of former NFL running back Maurice Morris.

References

External links 
 New Orleans Saints bio
 Appalachian State Mountaineers bio

Living people
1998 births
Sportspeople from Spartanburg, South Carolina
American football linebackers
Appalachian State Mountaineers football players
Players of American football from South Carolina
New Orleans Saints players